Robert Kowalkowski (November 5, 1943 – September 17, 2009) was an American Football offensive guard who played for the Detroit Lions and the Green Bay Packers in a twelve-year career that lasted from 1966 to 1977 in the National Football League.

Kowalkowski played college football at the University of Virginia and was drafted in the fifth round of the 1965 NFL Draft by the Lions.  His son Scott was selected in the 1991 NFL Draft by the Philadelphia Eagles and also played with the Lions.

References

External links
 "Ex-Lions lineman Bob Kowalkowski dies at age 65," The Detroit News, Friday, September 18, 2009.
 Monarrez, Carlos. "Bob Kowalkowski was 'tough, physical'," Detroit Free Press, Saturday, September 19, 2009.
 Mlive.com information on Kowalkowski's death. - accessed 18 September 2009

1943 births
2009 deaths
American football offensive linemen
Detroit Lions players
Green Bay Packers players
Virginia Cavaliers football players
People from Drexel Hill, Pennsylvania